Karl Dennis Persson (born June 2, 1988) is a Swedish former professional ice hockey defenceman. He most notably played in the Swedish Hockey League (SHL).

Playing career
Persson was drafted by the Buffalo Sabres in the first round, 24th overall, in the 2006 NHL Entry Draft. After two seasons in the then Elitserien with Djurgårdens IF he was signed to a three-year entry-level deal with the Buffalo Sabres on June 3, 2008. He was then loaned to fellow Elitserien club, Timrå IK for the following 2008–09 season, before joining the Sabres American Hockey League affiliate, the Portland Pirates at the conclusion of the Swedish year.

Over the course of his contract with the Sabres, Persson was assigned directly to the AHL in each of his three years. He was an emergency recall for the Sabres during their 2011 playoff series against the Philadelphia Flyers; however, he did not play in a game.

Persson returned to his native Sweden after the Sabres declined to extend his contract, signing with Brynäs IF for two seasons before moving to his fourth SHL club, Modo Hockey on an optional two-year deal on May 5, 2014.

Career statistics

Regular season and playoffs

International

References

External links

1988 births
Living people
Almtuna IS players
IF Björklöven players
Brynäs IF players
Buffalo Sabres draft picks
Djurgårdens IF Hockey players
Modo Hockey players
National Hockey League first-round draft picks
Nyköpings Hockey players
People from Nyköping Municipality
Portland Pirates players
Rochester Americans players
Swedish ice hockey defencemen
Swedish expatriate ice hockey players in the United States
VIK Västerås HK players
Sportspeople from Södermanland County